Ottakkomban is an upcoming Indian Malayalam-language action film directed by Mathews Thomas, written by Shibin Francis and produced by Tomichan Mulakuppadam of Mulakuppadam Films. The film stars Suresh Gopi, Anushka Shetty and Biju Menon in the lead roles while Namitha Pramod, Mukesh, Vijayaraghavan, Johny Antony, Anant Mahadevan and Renji Panicker play prominent  supporting roles.

Harshavardhan Rameshwar is the music composer while Shaji Kumar handles the cinematography. Principal photography of the film began by December 2019. The film's action sequences are choreographed by Peter Hein, Ram Laxman, Stunt Silva, Supreme Sundar and Phoenix Prabhu.

Cast
 Suresh Gopi as Kaduvakkunnel Kuruvachan 
 Anushka Shetty as Anna
 joju varghese  
 Biju Menon as Noble
 Mukesh
 Namitha Pramod
 Vijayaraghavan
 Johny Antony
 Anant Mahadevan
 Renji Panicker
 Harikrishnan
 Ashish Vidyarthi
 Sudhi Koppa
 Jinu Joseph
 Dinesh Prabhakar
 Srikant Murali
 Suresh Krishna
 Jaffar Idukki
 Kollam Thulasi

Production

Development 
Mathews with the help of his mentor and director Johny Antony approached producer Tomichan Mulakuppadam, who got interested in the film and agreed to produce it. Suresh Gopi himself revealed it as his 250th film and announced it through social media. It is written by Shibin Francis, who had earlier worked on Paavada (2016), Comrade in America (2017) and Under World (2019). According to Francis, the film is an action-based family drama which takes place in Pala, Kerala. He adds that it is a fictional story based on Suresh Gopi's fictional character Kuruvachan who is a family man and a trader by profession, having his issues. The film will show how the traders and businesses in and around Pala have evolved over the period and the main character will reflect its changes.

Filming 
The filming commenced by shooting brief portions in December 2019. Arjun Reddy's composer Harshavardhan Rameshwar and cinematographer Shaji Kumar were also added to the technical team. The character look and motion poster of the film were revealed on 26 June 2020, on the occasion of Suresh Gopi’s 62nd birthday. Tomichan met Mathews and Gopi at the latter's residence on 14 January 2021 and estimated the film's budget as ₹25 crore. By January 2021, Biju Menon was reported to play a major part in the film. Its filming was confirmed to take place at Pala, Kochi, Mangalore and Malaysia. Namitha Pramod, Mukesh, Vijayaraghavan, Anant Mahadevan, Renji Panicker, Johny Antony, Sudhi Koppa, Ashish Vidyarthi, Suresh Krishna and Jaffar Idukki were also added to the film's cast. On the occasion of Suresh Gopi's 63rd birthday, the makers revealed his second look from the movie.

References

External links
 
 

Upcoming Malayalam-language films
Upcoming films
Film productions suspended due to the COVID-19 pandemic
Films postponed due to the COVID-19 pandemic